United States House Judiciary Subcommittee on Administrative State, Regulatory Reform, and Antitrust is a subcommittee within the House Committee on the Judiciary. The Subcommittee's equivalent in the Senate is the Senate Judiciary Subcommittee on Competition Policy, Antitrust and Consumer Rights. It was previously known as the Subcommittee on Antitrust, Commercial and Administrative Law.

Jurisdiction
Bankruptcy and commercial law, bankruptcy judgeships, administrative law, independent counsel, state taxation affecting interstate commerce, interstate compacts, antitrust matters, other appropriate matters as referred by the Chairman, and relevant oversight.

Members, 118th Congress
To be confirmed.

Historical membership rosters

117th Congress

116th Congress

115th Congress

Significant hearings
 Equal Justice for Our Military Act of 2009 (June 11, 2009)

See also
  United States House Committee on the Judiciary

References

External links 
 Subcommittee homepage

Judiciary Regulatory Reform, Commercial and Antitrust Law